Russell Stephen King (born 11 April 1959) is a convicted fraudster. He is best known for his part in the doomed purchase of Notts County Football Club by Munto Finance, a subsidiary of Qadbak Investments, which was the subject of a BBC1 Panorama programme. In July 2018, after several years living in Bahrain, he was extradited to Jersey, where he was charged in the Jersey Royal Court with 25 counts of fraud and larceny. In 2019 he was there sentenced to six years imprisonment. He was released in 2021.

Background
King first surfaced in the 1980s as chairman of Celebrity Group Holdings, a publishing company based in Kingston upon Thames, which owned titles such as Basketball Monthly and which was interested in taking over Eddy Shah's newspaper The Post and Hamley's toy shop. It also owned Zodiac Toys, which became insolvent in 1990. Along with his business partner Alan Kingston, King was also a director of Kingston Basketball Club. However, in 1991 King was sentenced to two years in prison for insurance fraud after trying to claim £600,000 for his Aston Martin Zagato after claiming it had been stolen. It was discovered hidden in a garage. Whilst he was in prison, Celebrity Group went into liquidation and was sued for £684,000 by Creditcorp, which alleged fraudulent behaviour by Celebrity Group's directors.

In the 1990s, King was associated with the publicist Max Clifford, and appeared in a controversial episode of Kilroy where Clifford had a fracas with the member of parliament Roger Gale. In 2004, he was involved with a sports agency called Essentially Sport, which represented Jenson Button.

Belgravia Financial Services Group 
In the mid 2000s, King was involved with a Jersey-based company called Belgravia Financial Services Group. After the death of a business partner in 2008, King manipulated an employee of the business into transferring £671,000 from the business into his own personal account. He also sold the late partner's collection of cherished number plates and kept the proceeds. When Jersey-based company Close Finance sought repayment of £2m it had loaned to Belgravia, King fled to Bahrain.

Swiss Commodity Holding, First London Bank, and Notts County F.C.
In 2009, King founded a company called Swiss Commodity Holding, which claimed assets of $2 trillion besides the rights to all the gold, iron ore and coal in North Korea. He then approached British investment bank First London plc, and by falsely claiming he was managing billions of dollars for the Bahraini royal family, he got the bank to turn over 49 per cent of its shares to him. King then acted as head negotiator and consultant for the purchase of Notts County Football Club by Munto Finance, a subsidiary of Qadbak Investments, another company trading on nonexistent connections with wealthy Bahraini families. Despite claiming to have had no legal involvement in the scheme, King was able to negotiate the sale of the football club to Munto for £1. He recruited former England football manager Sven-Göran Eriksson as director of football at Notts County, promising him a large sum if he also worked for Swiss Commodity Holding (SCH). He used the nickname of L. Voldemort, after the Harry Potter character Lord Voldemort, and then later claimed that he could not have been involved because his name, Russell King, did not appear in any documents. The club was sold five months after the purchase with debts of £7 million, and First London plc went into administration with debts of £8.7 million.

Sven-Göran Eriksson and Peter Willett joined King on the trip. The purpose of the visit was to persuade the government to hand over gold mining rights in exchange for billions of US dollars allegedly from Bahraini investors.

Sauber
In 2009, Formula One team Sauber, seeking new investment, encountered Qadbak Investments. The deal collapsed when it was revealed that King was behind the company.

Bahraini magazines
From around 2013, King operated the Middle East edition of a magazine called Food and Travel using different aliases and claiming false statistics on the publication's circulation numbers. He also launched a magazine called FT Business Arabia, falsely claiming it to be the Middle East version of the Financial Times in order to obtain millions of dollars in advertising revenue. He also benefited from barter deals with top hospitality groups and luxury retail brands in the UAE.

2018 fraud and larceny charges
In 2018, King was extradited from Bahrain to Jersey, and on 27 July 2018, King was charged in the Jersey Royal Court with 25 counts of fraud and larceny that occurred while he was living in Jersey in 2008. These include allegedly selling the Belgravia Financial Services Group in a fraudulent manner, as well as falsification of accounts. Crown Advocate Matthew Jowitt stated "It is alleged the misappropriation is something in the order of £16 million." On 7 August 2018, it was reported that due to the complexity of the case and the speed at which events had happened, the bailiff, Sir William Bailhache, adjourned the case for three weeks, at which point pleas would be entered. In April 2019, King was sentenced to six years' imprisonment for stealing £670,000 from the Belgravia Group in 2008, and in August 2019 he was told to pay back £320,000 or face additional time in jail. He was released in 2021.

See also
 Flavio Briatore
 List of notable fraudsters

References

External links
BBC Panorama documentary on King

American fraudsters
Impostors
Living people
1959 births
People convicted of fraud